Alpha-1 Wrestling (A1) was a Canadian independent professional wrestling promotion based out of Hamilton, Ontario. The promotion was founded by Ethan Page in 2010 after he grew tired of inviting his family to see him in crappy bars commenting "I just figured I could do a better show myself". It went on hiatus in 2012 after one of the cameras used to tape a wrestling show was stolen for several months, and began a longer one in 2020 as a result of the COVID-19 pandemic. It is now permanently shut down.

Current champions

A1 Alpha Male Championship

Reigns

Combined reigns

A1 Outer Limits Championship

A1 Outer Limits Title Tournament

Reigns

A1 Zero Gravity Championship

Reigns

Combined reigns

A1 Tag Team Championship

Reigns

Combined reigns

By team

By wrestler

Tournaments

King Of Hearts 2018

King Of Hearts 2021

References

External links
 Alpha-1 Wrestling (A1)
 Official Website

Canadian professional wrestling promotions
Professional wrestling in Ontario